The Woodruff Stake House at 50 South Main in Woodruff, Utah was built during 1900–1901.  It was listed on the National Register of Historic Places in 2000.  It has also been known as Woodruff Stake Tithing House.

References

Properties of religious function on the National Register of Historic Places in Utah
Buildings and structures in Rich County, Utah
National Register of Historic Places in Rich County, Utah
Tithing buildings of the Church of Jesus Christ of Latter-day Saints